Newmarket Junior-Senior High School is the public high school and middle school for the town of Newmarket, Rockingham County, New Hampshire.

The teacher to student ratio is 1:13 due to the small number of students.

In the 2005–2006 school year the students did as well as expected on the NHEIAP exams ranking 26th out of 75 districts in math and 23rd of 75 in reading.

The Newmarket High school athletics teams compete in NHIAA Division IV. They have not won any recent championships but reached the finals in baseball in 2009 and in basketball from 2008–2009. The school mascot is the mule. The school colors are red and black. Rivals include Conant High School and Epping High School.

In 2015, U.S. News & World Report ranked the Newmarket High School as number nine in the state. The school is also ranked as number one in the seacoast.

The current principal is Andrew Korman.

References

External links
Newmarket Junior-Senior High School official website

Schools in Rockingham County, New Hampshire
Public high schools in New Hampshire
Public middle schools in New Hampshire
Newmarket, New Hampshire